The Stuart River is a river located in the Wide Bay–Burnett region of Queensland, Australia.

Course and features
The Stuart River rises in the Stuart Range, part of the Great Dividing Range, below Mount Kiangarow in the Bunya Mountains and within the Bunya Mountains National Park. It is impounded by Gordonbrook Dam 15km north-west of Kingaroy, and by the Proston Weir 5km south-west of the small town of Proston. Finally, the river enters Lake Boondooma where it reaches its confluence with the Boyne River, a tributary of the Burnett River. The Stuart River is joined by one minor tributary. The river descends  over its  course.

The Stuart River was named by James Charles Burnett, after Henry Stuart Russell, a pastoralist, explorer and historian, who explored the area in November 1842.

See also

References

External links

Rivers of Queensland
Wide Bay–Burnett
South Burnett Region